Denise Marsa is an American singer/songwriter, born in Trenton, New Jersey, United States.

She moved to New York City in the 1970s and formed her own band. When performing in a club she was approached by Dean Friedman, who invited her to sing on his next album. She sang a duet - "Lucky Stars" -  with Friedman, on his second album "Well, Well", Said The Rocking Chair.  The song made No. 3 in the UK Singles Chart in late 1978 and number 6 in Australia in early 1979  Marsa also sang backing vocals on several other songs on the album.  Because the record company did not publicize her name on the single, she was known as the "mystery voice" for some months.

She continued writing songs and performing around New York City, and sang lead vocals on The Flirts' song "Helpless (You Took my Love)" in 1984.  The same year, she moved to London to work as a songwriter with Warner-Chappell, but returned to the United States in 1989, moving to Los Angeles, where she worked as an events manager. She released a solo album, SELF, in 1998.

Also in 1998, she established a public relations and marketing business, KeyMedia Group (not related to the British marketing and design business Keymedia Ltd.).

In 2005 Marsa was a featured panelist on "How to Become a Successful Entrepreneur" for the New York University Office of Career Services during the University's career week program. She has also set up a non-profit venture, WO30 Records, which she describes as the first non-profit record label for women recording artists over 30.

References

American women singer-songwriters
Singer-songwriters from New Jersey
Living people
Year of birth missing (living people)
People from Trenton, New Jersey
21st-century American women